Durbin  is a very rare male first name and a very popular surname, according to the 1990 U.S. Census. The surname Durbin is of French origin from a place called D'urban or D'urbin in Languedoc.  At the time of the British Census of 1881, its relative frequency was highest in Somerset (36.9 times the British average), followed by Herefordshire, Monmouthshire, Gloucestershire, Brecknockshire, Glamorgan, Cambridgeshire, Wiltshire and Warwickshire.

 Allison Durbin (born 1950), New Zealand-born Australian former pop singer
 Blaine Durbin (1886–1943), Major League Baseball player
 Chad Durbin (born 1977), Major League Baseball pitcher
 Deanna Durbin (1921–2013), Canadian singer and actress
 Dick Durbin (born 1944), the Minority Whip for the 113th United States Senate
 Elisha John Durbin (1800–1887), American Catholic priest, the "patriarch-priest of Kentucky"
 Evan Durbin (1906–1948), British economist and left-wing politician
 Frank Durbin (1895–1999), one of the last surviving American veterans of the First World War
 Frederic S. Durbin, American fantasy/horror novelist
 J. D. Durbin (born 1982), baseball pitcher 
 James Durbin (1923–2012), British statistician and econometrician
 James Durbin (born 1989), American singer and guitarist, former American Idol contestant
 John Durbin, American actor
 John Price Durbin, Chaplain of the Senate, president of Dickinson College
 Mike Durbin, American ten-pin bowling player 
 Richard M. Durbin (born 1960), computational biologist
 William Durbin (born 1953), American martial artist, especially of Kiyojute Ryu
 Winfield T. Durbin (1847–1928), Governor of Indiana, USA

References

French-language surnames